Adam Montgomery Richman   is an American actor and television host. He has hosted various dining and eating-challenge programs on the Travel Channel and History Channel.

Early life and education
Richman, an only child, was born into a Jewish family in the New York City borough of Brooklyn, and raised in the Sheepshead Bay neighborhood. He attended "a Solomon Schechter school through eighth grade and then a Talmud Torah high school", ultimately graduating from Midwood High School. He completed his undergraduate degree in international studies at Emory University, and earned a master's degree from the Yale School of Drama. While attending Emory University, Richman was a member of Alpha Epsilon Pi fraternity.

Career
Richman's acting career has included guest roles on Guiding Light, All My Children, Law & Order: Trial by Jury, and he portrayed God as a butcher on Joan of Arcadia in 2004. In addition to appearing in regional theater productions throughout the United States, he was also seen in several national television commercials.

As a self-educated food expert and trained sushi chef, Richman has kept a travel journal that includes every restaurant he has visited since 1995.

Richman began as a TV host in 2008, with the Travel Channel show Man v. Food, which shows Richman visiting various cities and taking part in eating challenges there. Richman's tenure on the show lasted for four seasons, until 2012. (It was revived in 2017 with a new host, Casey Webb.) To maintain his health while taping the show, Richman would exercise twice a day. When the schedule permitted, he would not eat the day before a challenge. He also tried to stay hydrated by drinking a lot of water or club soda and forgoing coffee and soft drinks. For the show's fourth season, it was re-titled Man v. Food Nation, and Richman did not engage in the eating challenges himself, but rather coached others to do so. He stated at the time that this change was not done because he wanted to avoid eating large amounts of food, but rather in order to keep the show interesting.

During his time as a competitive eater, Richman gained a considerable amount of weight and became depressed. After retiring from competitive eating, he lost .

Richman was a paid spokesman for Zantac during Season 3 of Man v. Food.

Richman wrote the book America the Edible: A Hungry History from Sea to Dining Sea, which was released on November 9, 2010, by Rodale Publishing.

On January 23, 2011, Richman appeared on Food Network's Iron Chef America as a judge for a battle with Gruyère as the theme ingredient.

Richman hosted Travel Channel's The Traveler's Guide to Life, which debuted on January 26, 2011, and Amazing Eats, a spin-off of his popular series Man v. Food and Man v. Food Nation, which premiered on January 11, 2012.
 
Richman also hosted the TV series Adam Richman's Best Sandwich in America which premiered June 6, 2012. This 11-episode weekly series documented Richman's "nationwide quest to find the best thing since sliced bread 'on' sliced bread." He ultimately declared the roast-pork sandwich from Tommy DiNic's in Philadelphia's Reading Terminal Market his "Best Sandwich in America".

Richman hosted the Travel Channel's Adam Richman's Fandemonium, which ran for one season in 2013; the series showed him taking part in various fan events around the United States, such as sporting competitions. He hosted the NBC cooking competition show Food Fighters, which ran for two seasons from 2014 to 2015.

In June 2014, Richman posted a photo of his newly svelte physique on Instagram and boasted about his 70-pound weight loss, adding the hashtag "#thinspiration". The post caused controversy because this hashtag was said to be linked to eating disorders. Some Instagram users responded with criticism of the hashtag, and Richman responded to some of them with insults, referring to them as "haters" and telling one to "grab a razor blade & draw a bath". He later apologized, but the Travel Channel postponed Richman's series Man Finds Food, which was meant to begin airing in July 2014, until April 2015.

In 2015, Richman told The Independent that he eats a vegan diet when training for soccer.

Also in 2015, Richman was a judge on the British television series BBQ Champ, hosted by Myleene Klass and broadcast on ITV.

Richman is a leading contributor on the History network's The Food That Built America, which began airing in 2019. In February 2021, he began hosting the History series Modern Marvels and the next year began hosting Adam Eats the 80s.

Filmography

Personal life
Richman is a fan of the baseball team New York Yankees, soccer teams Tottenham Hotspur and Grimsby Town, and American football team Miami Dolphins (especially their Hall of Fame quarterback, Dan Marino).

On June 8, 2014, Richman represented the "Rest of the World" team in the annual Soccer Aid match against England at Old Trafford, Manchester, in a game that combined former professional players and celebrities. Richman was quoted as saying that he lost  for the game, and cried when he was asked to take part.

In June 2020 Richman became a shareholder in English football club Grimsby Town; he had also previously put money into the club via a fan fundraising scheme called "Operation Promotion".

References

External links

 

Living people
Male actors from New York City
Television personalities from New York City
Emory University alumni
Jewish American male actors
Man v. Food
People from Sheepshead Bay, Brooklyn
Yale School of Drama alumni
Midwood High School alumni
21st-century American Jews
Year of birth missing (living people)